Yasmin Daswani (born 21 September 1994) is an English-born Hong Kong women's cricketer and lawyer who represents the Hong Kong national women's national cricket team in international cricket.

In February 2022, Daswani was announced as a player in the 2022 FairBreak Invitational T20 – an ICC sanctioned competition that will take place on May 1–15, 2022 in Dubai in conjunction with Cricket Hong Kong. The six-team tournament is made up of players from all around the world and will be the world’s first privately funded tournament in women’s cricket history with the leading healthcare group Gencor as the lead sponsor.

Early life and education

Daswani was born on 21 September 1994  She studied law at Durham University and following a two year break started practicing as a solicitor at Fladgate LLP.

Notable performances

In 2010, Daswani was awarded player of the tournament at the ACC Under-19 Women's Championship 2010.

In 2017, she was awarded player of the tournament at the 2017 Women's Twenty20 East Asia Cup with figures of 77 off 64 against Korea, 71 off 68 against China and 31 off 49 against Japan

References

External links 
 Cricinfo

1994 births
Living people
Hong Kong people
Hong Kong women cricketers
Hong Kong women Twenty20 International cricketers
Cricketers at the 2010 Asian Games
Asian Games competitors for Hong Kong
English people of Indian descent
Hong Kong people of Indian descent
English emigrants to Hong Kong